True hermaphroditism, sometimes referred to as ovotesticular syndrome, is an intersex condition in which an individual is born with both ovarian and testicular tissue. Commonly, one or both gonads is an ovotestis containing both types of tissue.

Although it is similar in some ways to mixed gonadal dysgenesis, the conditions can be distinguished histologically.

Symptoms 
 Gynecomastia (present in 75% of cases.)

History 
The first medical attempts to document cases appeared in the 16th century. Up until the Late Middle Ages individuals with these conditions were viewed as monsters.

Causes
There are several ways in which this may occur. 
 It can be caused by the division of one ovum, followed by fertilization of each haploid ovum and fusion of the two zygotes early in development.
 Alternately, an ovum can be fertilized by two sperm followed by trisomic rescue in one or more daughter cells.
 Two ova fertilized by two sperm cells will occasionally fuse to form a tetragametic chimera, if one male zygote and one female zygote fuse.
 It can be associated with a mutation in the SRY gene.

Karyotypes
In ovotesticular syndrome, XX is the most common (55-80% of cases); most individuals with this form are SRY negative.

Next most common are XX/XY (20-30% of cases) and XY (5-15% of cases), with the remainder being a variety of other chromosomal anomalies and mosaicisms.

Some degree of mosaicism is present in about 25%.

Encountered karyotypes include 46XX/46XY, or 46XX/47XXY or XX & XY with SRY mutations, mixed chromosomal anomalies or hormone deficiency/excess disorders, 47XXY.

Less than 1% have XX/XY chimerism.

Prevalence 
True hermaphroditism represents 5% of all sex disorder differentiations.

The exact number of confirmed cases is uncertain, but by 1991 approximately 500 cases had been confirmed.

It has also been estimated that more than 525 have been documented.

Fertility 
The gonad most likely to function is the ovary. The ovotestes show evidence of ovulation in 50% of cases. Spermatogenesis has only been observed in solitary testes and not in the testicular portions of ovotestes. According to a 1994 study, spermatogenesis has only been proven in two cases. One of the two cases, having XX,46/XY,46 mixture had fathered a child.

It has been estimated that 80% of cases could be fertile as females with the right surgeries.

Documented cases of fertility 
There are extremely rare cases of fertility in "truly hermaphroditic" humans.

In 1994 a study on 283 cases found 21 pregnancies from 10 true hermaphrodites, while one allegedly fathered a child.

As of 2010, there have been at least 11 reported cases of fertility in true hermaphrodite humans in the scientific literature, with one case of a person with XY-predominant (96%) mosaic giving birth. All known offspring have been male. There has been at least one case of an individual being fertile as a male.

There is a hypothetical scenario, in which it could be possible for a human to self-fertilize. If a human chimera is formed from a male and female zygote fusing into a single embryo, giving an individual functional gonadal tissue of both types, such self-fertilization is feasible. Indeed, it is known to occur in non-human species where hermaphroditic animals are common. However, no such case of functional self-fertilization or true bisexuality has been documented in humans.

Etymology

According to Ovid, he fused with the nymph Salmacis resulting in one individual possessing physical traits of both sexes; according to the earlier Diodorus Siculus, he was born with a physical body combining both sexes. Usage of the term dates back to the third century BC. The word hermaphrodite entered the English lexicon in the late fourteenth century.

Society and culture
Having ovotesticular syndrome of sexual development can make one inadmissible for service in the United States Armed Forces.

M.C. v. Aaronson

The U.S. legal case of M.C. v. Aaronson, advanced by intersex civil society organization interACT with the Southern Poverty Law Center, was brought before the courts in 2013. The child in the case was born in December 2004 with ovotestes,  initially determined as male, but subsequently assigned female and placed in the care of South Carolina Department of Social Services in February 2005. Physicians responsible for M.C. initially concluded that surgery was not urgent or necessary and M.C. had potential to identify as male or female, but, in April 2006, M.C. was subjected to feminizing medical interventions. According to the Encyclopedia Britannica, "The reconstruction of female genitalia was more readily performed than the reconstruction of male genitalia, so ambiguous individuals often were made to be female." He was adopted in December 2006. M.C. identified as male at the time the case was brought, at age eight. The defendant in the case, Dr. Ian Aaronson, had written in 2001 that "feminizing genitoplasty on an infant who might eventually identify herself as a boy would be catastrophic".

The defendants sought to dismiss the case and seek a defense of qualified immunity, but these were denied by the District Court for the District of South Carolina. In January 2015, the Court of Appeals for the Fourth Circuit reversed this decision and dismissed the complaint, stating that, it did not "mean to diminish the severe harm that M.C. claims to have suffered" but that in 2006 it was not clear that there was precedent that the surgery on a sixteen-month-old violated an established constitutional right. The Court did not rule on whether or not the surgery violated M.C.'s constitutional rights.

State suits were subsequently filed. In July 2017, it was reported that the case had been settled out of court by the Medical University of South Carolina for $440,000. The university denied negligence, but agreed to a "compromise" settlement to avoid "costs of litigation."

See also
 46,XX/46,XY
 Intersex people and military service in the United States

References

External links 

 

Congenital disorders of genital organs
Rare diseases
Intersex variations